Zack Keller (born September 8, 1984) is an American author, comic book creator, writer, director, editor, and voice actor. He is a narrative director at King Digital Entertainment and a comic book creator and writer for Dark Horse Comics. He is the co-creator of the Mondo Media animated web series Dick Figures, as well as the co-director and co-writer its Kickstarter funded feature film Dick Figures: The Movie, alongside best friend and business partner Ed Skudder, both of whom voiced main characters Blue and Red respectively. He has also worked as a writer on The Walking Dead: Michonne, Batman: The Telltale Series, Guardians of the Galaxy: The Telltale Series at Telltale Games, and the animated television series Unikitty!.

Keller is also the author of the Cuphead series of graphic novels published starting in 2020 by Dark Horse Comics and illustrated in 1930s animation style by Shawn Dickinson. He'd also co-write a five-part book series titled Meet Me By The Falls, alongside John Dussenberry and  former Dick Figures co-star Ben Tuller.

Feature films

Short films

Television

Video games

References

External links
 
 

Living people
American writers
American directors
American editors
American male voice actors
1984 births